The National Museum of Mathematics  or MoMath is a museum in Manhattan, New York City dedicated to mathematics.
Opened on December 15, 2012, it is the only museum in North America dedicated to mathematics and features over thirty interactive exhibits. The mission of the museum is to "enhance public understanding and perception of mathematics". The museum is known for a special tricycle with square wheels, which operates smoothly on a catenary surface.

History
In 2006 the Goudreau Museum on Long Island, at the time the only museum in the United States dedicated to mathematics, closed its doors. In response, a group led by founder and former CEO Glen Whitney met to explore the opening of a new museum. They received a charter from the New York State Department of Education in 2009, and raised over 22 million dollars in under four years.

With this funding, a  space was leased in the Goddard Building at 11-13 East 26th Street, located in the Madison Square North Historic District. Despite some opposition to the architectural plans within the local community, permission for construction was granted by the New York City Landmarks Preservation Commission and the Department of Buildings.

The current board chair is John Overdeck, co-chairman of Two Sigma Investments.

Programs
 Math Midway is a traveling exhibition of math-based interactive displays. The exhibits include a square-wheeled tricycle that travels smoothly over an undulating cycloidal track; the Ring of Fire, which uses lasers to intersect three-dimensional objects with a two-dimensional plane to uncover interesting shapes; and an "organ function grinder" which allows users to create their own mathematical functions and see the results. After making its debut at the World Science Festival in 2009, Math Midway traveled the country, reaching more than a half million visitors.  The Midway's schedule included stops in New York, Pennsylvania, Texas, California, New Jersey, Ohio, Maryland, Florida, Indiana, and Oregon.   In 2016, the Math Midway exhibit was sold to the Science Centre Singapore.
 Math Midway 2 Go (MM2GO) is a spinoff of Math Midway. MM2GO includes six of the most popular Math Midway Exhibits. MM2GO began traveling to science festivals, schools, community centers, and libraries in the autumn of 2012.
 Math Encounters is a monthly speaker series presented by the Museum of Math and the Simons Foundation. The lectures initially took place at Baruch College in Manhattan on the first Wednesday of each month, but moved to MoMath's visitor center at 11 East 26th Street in March, 2013. Every month a different mathematician is invited to deliver a lecture. Lecturers have included Google's Director of Research Peter Norvig, journalist Paul Hoffman, and computer scientist Craig Kaplan. Examples of topics are "The Geometry of Origami", "The Patterns of Juggling", and "Mathematical Morsels from The Simpsons and Futurama". The lectures are meant to be accessible and engaging for high school students and adults. The first lecture occurred on March 3, 2011. Twenty unique lectures had been delivered .

Exhibits

In October 2016, the  exhibit The Insides of Things: The Art of Miguel Berrocal was opened, displaying a collection of puzzle sculptures by Spanish artist Miguel Ortiz Berrocal (1933-2006), donated by the late Samuel Sensiper. Each sculpture can be disassembled into small interlocking pieces, eventually revealing a small piece of jewelry or other surprise.

Visiting professorship
On August 2, 2018, MoMath announced the creation of a Distinguished Chair for the Public Dissemination of Mathematics.  Princeton professor and Fields Medal winner Manjul Bhargava was named as the first recipient of this position.

Dr. Bhargava was succeeded by Peter Winkler, Dartmouth College Professor of Mathematics and Computer Science as the Distinguished Chair for 2019-2020.

In July 2020, Rutgers university Professor  was announced as the Distinguished Chair for 2020-21. Dr. Kontorovich presented public programs concerning the history of mathematical ideas and the intersection of mathematics and music.

The 2021-22 Distinguished Chair for the Public Dissemination of Mathematics was Steven Strogatz, Cornell University Professor of Applied Mathematics, an award-winning mathematician, author and broadcaster.

The fifth Distinguished Chair, announced in June 2021 is Tim Chartier, a Professor of Mathematics and Computer Science at Davidson College and a professionally-trained mime. At the same time, MoMath announced that the 2023-24 Distinguished Chair will be Ingrid Daubechies, Professor of Mathematics at Duke University.

See also
 Mathematica: A World of Numbers... and Beyond – a classic exhibit of mathematical concepts, organized by Ray and Charles Eames
 Science tourism

References

External links 

Math Encounters
Math Midway

Museums in Manhattan
Children's museums in New York City
Science museums in New York City
2009 establishments in New York City
Midtown Manhattan
Mathematics museums
Association of Science-Technology Centers member institutions
Museums established in 2009